Craugastor campbelli is a species of frog in the family Craugastoridae. The species is endemic to Guatemala.

Etymology
The specific name, campbelli, is in honor of American herpetologist Jonathan A. Campbell.

Geographic range
C. campbelli is known from the Montañas del Mico in Izabal Department, Guatemala.

Habitat

Behavior

Reproduction
C. campbelli reproduces by direct development.

References

Further reading
Hedges SB, Duellman WE, Heinicke MP (2008). "New World direct-developing frogs (Anura: Terrarana): molecular phylogeny, classification, biogeography, and conservation". Zootaxa 1737: 1–182. (Craugastor campbelli, p. 45).
Smith EN (2005). "Two new species of Eleutherodactylus (Anura: Leptodactylidae) of the alfredi group from eastern Guatemala". Herpetologica 61: 286–295. (Eleutherodactylus campbelli, new species, p. 287).

campbelli
Endemic fauna of Guatemala
Amphibians of Guatemala
Amphibians described in 2005
Taxonomy articles created by Polbot